A Schenkele, or Schenkela (in Alsace), Schänkeli, Schenkeli, Schenggeli, Schänggeli (in Switzerland) is a small cylindrical sweet fritter eaten around Christmas and Fasnacht in Alsace and German-speaking Switzerland.

Other names include  ("women's thighs") in France.

A reference to  can be found as early as 1787 by Kaspar von Stieler as "im Elsass schenkele zur bezeichnung kleiner, länglicher brödchen" ("in Alsace schenkele to mean small, elongated bread rolls").

Preparation 
 are made from a dough of flour, sugar, butter, eggs, ground almonds or walnuts additionally flavored using candied orange or lemon peel and Kirsch. The dough is formed into finger-sized cylinders, deep-fried and dusted with sugar. They are shelf-stable and their flavor intensifies with storage.

See also

 Culinary Heritage of Switzerland

References 

Alsatian cuisine
Culinary Heritage of Switzerland
Fritters
Christmas food
Carnival foods
Swiss pastries